Axwell House (also Axwell Hall or Axwell Park) is a mansion house and Grade II* listed building, situated at Axwell Park, Blaydon, Tyne and Wear, England.

The house and surrounding estate were developed in 1758 and owned by the Clavering baronets until 1920 when it became a Ragged School. Then from 2005 it went under general development as new houses and apartments, however the development plan was not completed. In 2018, after the previous unsuccess, the hall was bought by a local businessman, owner of Trojan Scaffolding and Trojan Skips (Trojan North East), Steven Parker, and has since been under constructional development.

History

An early manor house on the site was acquired by James Clavering, a merchant adventurer of Newcastle upon Tyne in 1629 for £1,700. In 1758 his descendant Sir Thomas Clavering of the Clavering baronets replaced the house with a substantial mansion and assisted architect James Paine (1712–1789) in the Palladian design of the new house. The grounds were laid out in the style of Capability Brown. Alterations were around 1818 by John Dobson.

The hall and its surrounding  was converted for use as the Newcastle Ragged School in 1920. It was initially  an Industrial School and then an Approved school. It had spaces for 153 children and closed in 1981.

Having stood empty, neglected and deteriorating the property was acquired in 2005 by property developers, Eight Property Ltd, for restoration and conversion to residential apartments. The company built 27 apartments and houses around the old stable block and are developing the main house.

Architecture

The three-storey stone building has a slate roof. The south front has a three-bay with a pediment. It was designated as a listed building in 1985.

The attached farm has a late 18th or early 19th century dovecote. The grounds also included a dairy, walled kitchen garden and stables.

References

Axwell House
Country houses in Tyne and Wear